Aoife Cooke (born 13 September 1986) is an Irish national champion long-distance runner.

She qualified for the Marathon race at the 2020 Tokyo Olympics when she won the Cheshire Elite Marathon women's race on 25 April 2021. In doing so she improved her personal best by almost four minutes to 2:28:36 becoming only the fifth Irish woman to break 2:30. It was also Cooke's first marathon since the 2019 Dublin Marathon, 18 months previously, where she also won the national title that came with being the top Irish woman.
 At the Olympics in Tokyo Cooke struggled in the hot and humid conditions and did not finish the marathon.

Personal life
She is a lesbian.

References

External links
 
 
 
 

1986 births
Living people
Irish female long-distance runners
Irish female marathon runners
Sportspeople from Cork (city)
Irish LGBT sportspeople
Athletes (track and field) at the 2020 Summer Olympics
LGBT track and field athletes
Lesbian sportswomen
Olympic athletes of Ireland
21st-century Irish LGBT people